Sir George Gerard de Hochepied Larpent, 1st Baronet (16 February 1786 – 8 March 1855) was a British businessman of Huguenot and Dutch descent and a Liberal Party politician.

Early life
Larpent born in London. At that time he added de Hochepied to his family name, Larpent. He was made a British baronet in 1841. His father was John Larpent, the inspector of plays.  His mother, Anna Margaretta Porter, assisted in this work.  She kept a journal for most of her life which is now in the Huntington Library. His elder brother, John James Larpent, inherited the Hungarian title of Baron de Hochpied, through his mother's line, upon the death of their uncle, George de Hochepied, 6th Baron de Hochepied, in 1828.

His maternal grandparents were Sir James Porter, the British Ambassador to the Ottoman Empire, and the former Clarissa Catherine de Hochepied (a daughter of Elbert de Hochepied, 2nd Baron de Hochepied, the Dutch Ambassador to Constantinople).

Career
He was involved with trade to India, entering the East India house of Cockerell & Larpent, before becoming chairman of the Oriental and China Association, and was deputy chairman of the St. Katherine's Dock company. Larpent stood unsuccessfully for Parliament at a by-election in May 1840 for Ludlow He was unsuccessful again at a by-election in April 1841 for Nottingham but at the general election in June 1841, just prior to becoming a baronet in August, he won the seat. However, he served little more than a year as a Member of Parliament (MP) for Nottingham; he resigned from Parliament in May 1842.  At the 1847 general election he stood in the City of London, where he fell just three votes short of winning the fourth seat.

In 1847 he was Chairman of 'a Committee for promoting the extension of Steam Navigation to Australia and New Zealand', which also included the pioneer of the 'overland route' to the East, Lt. Thomas Waghorn, and another would-be improver of routes to the East, Henry Wise.

He edited the Peninsular War journal  of his half-brother, Francis Seymour Larpent, and a History of Turkey  from papers left by his grandfather, Sir James Porter.

Personal life
Sir George was twice married. On 13 October 1813, he married Charlotte Cracroft, a daughter of William Cracroft of the Exchequer Office, and Elizabeth Sewell Hawkes. Before her death on 18 February 1851, they were the parents of:

 Sir Albert John Larpent, 2nd Baronet (1816–1861), who married Catherine Lydia Shaw, daughter of Major Lewis Simeon Shaw, of the Bengal Staff Corps, in 1838.
 Anna Catherine de Hochepied Larpent (1819–1893), who married the Rev. Edward Aislabie Ommanney, Prebendary of Wells Cathedral and eldest son of Sir Francis Ommanney, in 1841.
 Frederick Seymour de Hochepied Larpent (1822–1846), who died unmarried.

On 17 July 1852, he married Louisa Martha Bailey, daughter of George Bailey of Windsor. Before her death on 23 March 1856, they were the parents of two children who died in infancy.

Sir George died on 8 March 1855, and was succeeded in the baronetcy by his eldest son, Albert.

Legacy
In Lady Larpent's garden at Roehampton, Hampshire, Ceratostigma plumbaginoides was first successfully flowered in England; it was at first given the name Plumbago larpentae, "Lady Larpent's Plumbago".

His grandson, George Albert Larpent, the third and last baronet who fought in the Kaffir War, committed suicide in 1899 after which the baronetcy became extinct.

References

External links 

1786 births
1855 deaths
Baronets in the Baronetage of the United Kingdom
Hungarian nobility
Liberal Party (UK) MPs for English constituencies
UK MPs 1837–1841
UK MPs 1841–1847
Burials at Kensal Green Cemetery